Victor Borghi (3 November 1912 – 8 March 1986) was a Swiss cross-country skier. He competed in the men's 50 kilometre event at the 1948 Winter Olympics.

References

1912 births
1986 deaths
Swiss male cross-country skiers
Olympic cross-country skiers of Switzerland
Cross-country skiers at the 1948 Winter Olympics
Place of birth missing